Siechem Madurai Panthers (also called Madurai Panthers & Madurai Super Giants) is a Twenty20 cricket team representing the city of Madurai in the Tamil Nadu Premier League (TNPL). This was the least successful team in the first two seasons of TNPL. In the third edition, they became champions of the league, beating Dindigul Dragons in the final. The team was purchased by Siechem Technologies and was later sold to Mrs. Pooja Damodaren. The head coach is Sriram Krishnamurthy, and the captain is Chaturved N S.

Squad 
 Chaturved N S,  (captain, batsman)
 Aadithya V (batsman)
 Anirudh Sita Ram B (batsman)
 Arun Karthick KB  (batsman/wicket-keeper)
 Aushik Srinivas R (bowler)
 Ayush M (bowler)
 Deeban Lingesh K (all-rounder)
 Gowtham V  (bowler)
 Kiran Akash L (bowler)
 Koushik J (all-Rounder)
 Mithun R (all-Rounder)
 Raj Kumar K   (batsman)
 Rithvik Eshwaran  (batsman/wicket-keeper)
 Rocky B  (bowler) 
 Saravanan S (bowler)
 Silambarasan R (bowler)
 Senthil Nathan S (all-rounder)
 Subramanyan J (all-rounder)
 Thalaivan Sargunam X (batsman)
 Varun Chakaravarthy (bowler)
 Vignesh Iyer S  (batsman)

Records 
 Madurai Panthers won the TNPL edition of 2018 beating Dindigul Dragons.
 Madurai is the least successful team in first two editions of TNPL, with no wins in their 14 games.

References 

Tamil Nadu Premier League